The 1976 Sunderland Metropolitan Borough Council election was held on 6 May 1976. A third of the seats on the Council were up for election, with each of the 26 council wards returning one councillor by first-past-the-post. The election was held on the same day as other local elections.

Election results 
Labour maintained a comfortable majority on the Council after the election, despite losing three seats to the Conservatives.
 
 
 

 
 
 

The election resulted in the following composition of the Council:

References 

Sunderland City Council elections